Roel may refer to a Dutch masculine given name that is a short form of either Roeland or Roelof, or to a Hispanic surname. People with the name include

Given name

Academics
 Roel van den Broek (born 1931), Dutch religious history scholar
 Roel Konijnendijk, Dutch historian and Classicist
 Roel Kuiper (born 1962), Dutch historian, philosopher, and politician
 Roel Nusse (born 1950), Dutch developmental biologist at Stanford University
 Roel Sterckx (born 1969), Belgian-British sinologist and anthropologist
 Roel in 't Veld, (born 1942), Dutch Public administration scholar 
 Roel Vertegaal (born 1968), Dutch-Canadian computer interface scientist
 Roel Wieringa (born 1952), Dutch computer scientist

Arts
 (born 1942), Dutch movie actor, in Italy known as "Glenn Saxson"
 Roel Cortez (1967–2015), Filipino singer and songwriter
 (1921–1996), Belgian surrealist sculptor and graphic artist
 Roel Dieltiens (born 1957), Belgian cellist and composer
 Roel Caboverde Llacer (born 1947), Cuban painter
 Roel Reiné (born 1969), Los Angeles-based Dutch film director
 Roel van Velzen (born 1978), Dutch singer and songwriter
 Roel Jeroen van der Linden (born 1982), Dutch painter

Business
 Roel Campos (born 1949), Hispanic-American business lawyer
 Roel Pieper (born 1956), Dutch IT-entrepreneur
 Roel de Vries (born 1968), Dutch born engineer and businessman

Politics
 Roel Degamo (born 1966), Filipino politician
 Roel van Duijn (born 1943), Dutch politician, political activist and writer
 Roel Robbertsen (born 1948), Dutch politician
 Roel de Vries (born 1943), Dutch trade union leader
 Roel de Wit (1927–2012), Dutch Labour Party politician and conservationist

Sports
 Roel Boomstra (born 1993), Dutch draughts player
 Roel Braas (born 1987), Dutch rower
 Roel Brouwers (born 1981), Dutch football defender
 Roel Buikema (born 1976), Dutch football midfielder
 Roel van Hemert (born 1984), Dutch football defender
 Roel Janssen (born 1990), Dutch football defender
 Roel Koolen (born 1982), Dutch baseball player
 Roel Luynenburg (born 1945), Dutch rower
 Roel de Mon (1919–1973), Dutch baseball pitcher
 Roel Moors (born 1978), Belgian basketball player
 Roel Paulissen (born 1976), Belgian mountain biker
 Roel Rothkrans (born 1979), Dutch handball player
 Roel van de Sande (born 1987), Dutch football midfielder
 Roel Santos (born 1987), Cuban baseball player
 Roel Stoffels (born 1987), Dutch football midfielder
 Roel Velasco (born 1969), Filipino boxer
 Roel Wiersma (1932–1995), Dutch football defender
 Roel De Bie (born 1988), Belgian volleybal player

Fictional
 Roel Dijkstra, eponymous football player of a comic book series (1977–1995)

Surname
 César Roel Schreurs (born 1941), Mexican actor and rock-and-roll singer
 Fernando García Roel (1921 – 2009), Mexican chemical engineer
 Gabriela Roel (born 1959), Mexican film and television actress
 José Roel Lungay (born 1960, also known as Father Roel, or Fro), Filipino priest
 Lise Roel (born 1928), architect from Denmark
 Válber Roel de Oliveira (born 1967), former association footballer from Brazil

Dutch masculine given names